Kamila Ganszczyk (born 2 December 1991) is a Polish volleyball player, playing as a middle-blocker.

She is part of the Poland women's national volleyball team. 
She competed at the 2015 Women's European Volleyball Championship, and the 2016 FIVB Volleyball World Grand Prix. On club level she plays for KSZO Ostrowiec Św.

References

External links 
 http://katowickisport.pl/siatkowka/liga-siatkowki-kobiet,kamil-ganszczyk-o-ligowych-zamaganich,artykul,753909,1,12511.html

1991 births
Living people
Polish women's volleyball players
Place of birth missing (living people)